Queer Duck is an adult animated series produced by Icebox.com that originally appeared on the company's website, then later moved to the American cable network Showtime, and returned to TV on Teletoon at Night, where it aired following the American version of Queer as Folk. Although far from being the first gay cartoon character, Queer Duck was the first animated series to have homosexuality as its predominant theme.

Like several later television cartoons, Queer Duck was animated in Macromedia Flash.  The show was created, written, and executive-produced by Mike Reiss, who also produced network cartoons The Simpsons and The Critic. Queer Duck animation was directed and designed by Xeth Feinberg; the theme song was performed by drag celebrity RuPaul.

Scholar Lawrence La Fountain-Stokes called the use of the term queer duck as "interesting" and described the show as about a "group of American gay animals" with their personalities seemingly "based on gay white men."

Characters

Queer Duck 
The title character, whose full name is Adam Seymour Duckstein (voiced by Jim J. Bullock), is a gay anthropomorphic duck who works as a nurse. In an interview included on the DVD release of Queer Duck: The Movie Reiss states that Bullock is the only member of the cast that is actually gay, and that he had insisted that the character be voiced by someone gay.

Queer Duck has cyan-colored feathers, a little spiky fringe, and wears purple eye shadow. He wears a sleeveless rainbow top and, like almost everyone else in the series, does not wear trousers. This follows the tradition of semi-nudity of cartoon animals exemplified by Porky Pig, Donald Duck, Top Cat, etc. He is often shown to have two fingers and one thumb on each hand, though on occasion he has the three fingers and one thumb per hand that is typical of many contemporary cartoons.

Queer Duck is known to gossip about anything and everything, especially on the phone while watching television, as shown on Oh Christ!, The Gaining of Herpes from Sparky and A Gay Outing. He is promiscuous in his own way, but not as obsessed with sex as his boyfriend Openly Gator; for example, he'll often utter the word "cock" but swiftly follows it with another word, like "tails", such as in The Gay Road to Morocco.

His nemesis is known to be radio show host Laura Schlessinger, who is pictured as a haggard and ugly old woman.

Queer Duck has also been a victim of gay bashing, as shown in Ku Klux Klan & Ollie, in which Ku Klux Klan members attempt to burn his house down. When his disguise fails, he kisses the unveiled Jerry Falwell, only to get shot down by the other homophobes. When in heaven he finds out that famous icons like Socrates and Leonardo da Vinci are also gay, much to the chagrin of Jerry Falwell.

Over the course of the series, the audience learns that Queer Duck has a Jewish mother who is in denial of his sexuality, a diabetic father (whose name is revealed to be Morty in the episode Quack Doctor), a straight brother named Lucky (who is shown to have bullied Queer Duck when they were younger), a nephew named Little Lucky and a lesbian sister named Melissa. Queer Duck is not the most beloved child in his family and there are strong hints that his older brother Lucky is the most favored one, due to his heterosexuality.

Queer Duck is afraid to show his sexuality to his nephew Little Lucky (who first appeared in Fiddler on the Roofie), especially while camping with two of Little Lucky's friends. They discovered one of his magazines, which included personal ads that contained acronyms like GBM, S&M and B&D. Lucky, however, is already aware of his uncle's sexual identity: when his fellow campers taunt him by saying, "Your uncle is gay", Lucky answers, "Well, DUH!".

Other characters 
 Openly Gator (voiced by Kevin Michael Richardson, in the style of Harvey Fierstein) is an alligator and Queer Duck's boyfriend. His full name is Steven Arlo Gator. He is shy and insecure, and is usually the voice of reason whenever Queer Duck gets himself or anyone else in trouble. He marries Queer Duck in a Jewish wedding in Vermont in the episode "Wedding Bell Blues" (although they are often seen as having an open relationship); a moose was the rabbi. He works as a waiter in a restaurant that both he and Queer Duck hate.
 Bi-Polar Bear (voiced by The Ren & Stimpy Show and Futurama actor Billy West, in the style of Paul Lynde) is a bisexual polar bear and one of Queer Duck's friends. He often makes bad jokes that he alone finds funny. He works in a perfume stand at a mall. He mentions his father is in a relationship with another man.
 Oscar Wildcat (voice actor Maurice LaMarche) is a gay cat and one of Queer Duck's friends, often portrayed as an alcoholic (he is always seen holding some form of alcohol, usually a martini). He has a deep dislike for his own mother and has implied that he would like to kill her. "If I came out it would kill mother!... I'll do it tonight." He owns a Shirley Temple antique store called "Shirley You Jest". His name is a reference to Oscar Wilde.

Recurring supporting characters include Queer Duck's mother (played by Estelle Harris, George's mother on Seinfeld) and the group's nemesis, Dr. Laura Schlessinger (played by voice actress Tress MacNeille). One character, a large, well-built horse, portrays different characters in each episode. He starts out as a gay-converting Christian minister but later portrays more gay-sensitive characters, such as a flight attendant on TWGay. Other characters who have appeared include Truman Coyote, Ricky Marlin and KY Jellyfish.

Recurring themes
Although each three-minute episode stands by itself, there are several recurring themes throughout the 20-episode series, such as coming out, gay relationships/marriages, and the problems that can arise when gay and lesbian people have to interact with their straight family members. These are explored through a variety of situations: Queer Duck comes out to his parents in the first episode; in another, Queer Duck and Openly Gator get married, and it's revealed that Queer Duck has a lesbian sister; and in other episodes, Queer Duck must deal with other family members, such as his straight brother, who is much beloved by their parents.

Much like The Critic, Queer Duck features numerous "cameo" voice appearances by celebrities; these voices are impersonated by the cast. In addition to Dr. Laura, the Queer Duck gang encounter Bob Hope, Jack Nicholson, Cary Grant and Barbra Streisand, with whom Queer Duck is obsessed, as well as noted ultra-conservative preacher Jerry Falwell. These celebrities are the only human characters. All other characters are anthropomorphic animals like Queer Duck and his friends, except for the woman Queer Duck sleeps with in the final episode.

Episodes

Legacy
In 2005, Queer Duck was voted among the 100 Greatest Cartoons in a poll conducted by the British television channel Channel 4, ranking at #94. In 2011, Queer Duck returned to introduce the 31st Jewish San Francisco Film Festival.

Film

Queer Duck: The Movie, a film based on the animated series, was released on DVD July 18, 2006. The film reunites the original creators and cast of Queer Duck, plus special guest stars Conan O'Brien as himself, Tim Curry as Peccery the butler, Jeff Glen Bennett as the main antagonist; a homophobic bigoted priest named Reverend Vandergelding, Mark Hamill as a hot dog vendor, Bruce Vilanch as himself, Andy Dick as former drag queen Rex (formerly Regina), Jackie Hoffman as Broadway actress Lola Buzzard, April Winchell doing additional voices and David Duchovny as "Tiny Jesus". Gay-themed channel Logo premiered the film on July 16. The film concerns Queer Duck struggling with his sexuality and his love crisis between his longtime partner Openly Gator or the spunky Broadway actress Lola Buiszzard.

See also
 LGBTQ representation in adult animation
 History of LGBT characters in animation: 2000s

References

External links

 
 
 Mishmash Media

2000s American adult animated television series
2000s American animated comedy television series
2000s American LGBT-related comedy television series
2000 American television series debuts
2002 American television series endings
American adult animated comedy television series
American flash adult animated television series
2000s Canadian adult animated television series
2000s Canadian animated comedy television series
2000s Canadian LGBT-related comedy television series 
2000 Canadian television series debuts
2002 Canadian television series endings
Canadian adult animated comedy television series
English-language television shows
Showtime (TV network) original programming
Animated television series about ducks
Animated television series about animals
Gay-related television shows
Fictional gay males
Fictional American Jews
American adult animated web series
American LGBT-related web series
LGBT-related animated web series
Fictional ducks